The 306th Infantry Regiment was a National Army unit first organized for service in World War I as part of the 77th Infantry Division in Europe.  It later served in the Pacific Theater during World War II.  Since then it has served as a training Regiment. In 1999, it was withdrawn from the Combat Arms Regimental System and redesignated as a non-branch regiment. The regiment's 1st, 2nd, 4th, and 5th battalions are stationed at Fort Stewart under the command of the 188th Infantry Brigade.  The 3rd Battalion is inactive.

History

World War I
 The Regiment was constituted 5 August 1917 in the National Army as the 306th Infantry and assigned to the 153rd Infantry Brigade of the 77th Division. It was organized at Camp Upton, New York on 29 August 1917. The regiment participated in the following campaigns: Oise-Aisne, Meuse-Argonne, Champagne, and Lorraine.  The regiment demobilized at Camp Upton on 9 May 1919.

Between the Wars
 The regiment was reconstituted in the Organized Reserves as the 306th Infantry on 24 June 1921 and reassigned to the 77th Division (later redesignated as the 77th Infantry Division) within the II Corps area.  It was actually organized in August 1921 with the entire Regiment located in New York, New York.  The 306th conducted summer training most years with the 16th and 18th Infantry Regiments at Camp Dix, New Jersey, or Fort Slocum, New York, and some years with the 26th Infantry Regiment at Plattsburg Barracks, New York.  The regiment also conducted infantry Citizens Military Training Camp (CMTC) training some years at Camp Dix and Plattsburg Barracks as an alternate form of summer training. The primary ROTC feeder schools were the College of the City of New York and New York University. The Regimental designated mobilization training station was Camp Jackson, South Carolina.

World War II
Ordered into active military service 25 March 1942 and reorganized at Fort Jackson, South Carolina.  The regiment participated in the January 1943 Louisiana Maneuvers.  In July 1943, the regiment was organized with 3,256 officers and enlisted men:
 Headquarters & Headquarters Company- 111
 Service Company- 114
 Anti-Tank Company- 165 (M1 gun)
 Cannon Company- 118 (M3 howitzer)
 Medical Detachment- 135
 Infantry Battalion (x3)- 871
 Headquarters & Headquarters Company- 126
 Rifle Company (x3)- 193  (M1 carbine, M1 Garand, M1903 Springfield, M3 submachine gun, M1919 Browning machine gun, M9 Rocket Launcher, M2 mortar)
 Weapons Company- 156 (M1 mortar, M2 machine gun)
The regiment departed San Francisco on 23 March 1944 and arrived in Hawaii on 1 April.  The 306th first saw combat during the liberation of Guam in July, 1944.  The 306th served in the liberation of the Philippines, arriving on 23 November 1944. The regiment fought on Okinawa from 27 April though 27 June.

Post War Service
 Activated 17 December 1946 in the Organized Reserves with headquarters in New York City.  In May 1959 the regiment was reorganized as a parent regiment under the Combat Arms Regimental System to consist of the 1st Battle Group, an element of the 77th Infantry Division under the Pentomic division design.  After adoption of the ROAD program,  the regiment was reorganized on 26 March 1963 to consist of the 1st and 2d Battalions, subordinate elements of the 77th Infantry Division.  The 1st and 2d Battalions were inactivated 30 December 1965 and relieved from assignment to the 77th Infantry Division.

Under the 87th Training Division
 The 307th Infantry was withdrawn 17 October 1999 from the Combat Arms Regimental System, redesignated as the 307th Regiment, and reorganized to consist of the 1st, 2d, and 3d Battalions, elements of the 87th Division (Training Support). The 1st, 2d, and 3d Battalions were concurrently allotted to the Regular Army.

Transfer to First Army
 On 15 December 2007, the battalions were relieved from their assignment to the 87th Division and reassigned to First Army’s 188th Infantry Brigade.  In October 2012, 3rd Battalion was inactivated.  In 2016, the 4th and 5th Battalions were activated at Fort Stewart.

Lineage and Honors

Lineage

Campaign Participation Credit

Decorations

References

External links
 Official homepage for the 188th Infantry Brigade

306
306th Infantry Regiment
Military units and formations established in 1917
1917 establishments in New York (state)